Bruce Monteath (born 20 September 1955) is a former Australian rules football player who played in the VFL between 1975 and 1980 for the Richmond Football Club. He also played in the WAFL for the South Fremantle Football Club between 1972 and 1974 and then again from 1981 to 1983. He ended his playing career at Claremont (1984-1985) and then coached the West Perth Football Club for the 1987 and 1988 seasons.

His greatest achievement came in 1980 when he captained Richmond to the 1980 Premiership, defeating Collingwood by a then-record 81 points. However, he spent very little time on the ground in this game, despite Richmond's dominance.

References

External links
 
 

1955 births
Living people
Richmond Football Club players
Richmond Football Club Premiership players
South Fremantle Football Club players
Claremont Football Club players
Western Australian State of Origin players
All-Australians (1953–1988)
Australian rules footballers from Western Australia
West Perth Football Club coaches
One-time VFL/AFL Premiership players